The Chinese order of battle in the 2020–2021 China–India skirmishes.

Background 

Prior deployment in Eastern Ladakh included 362nd and 363rd Border Defence Regiments. Companies from 362nd were stationed at Khurnak Fort and Spanggur Tso. 363rd have companies at Kongka La near Gogra/Hot Springs.A patrol boat squadron is deployed on Pangong Tso. 362nd and 363rd occupied pickets as the skirmishes progressed.

In April 2020, the 4th (Highland) Motorised Infantry and 6th (Highland) Mechanised Infantry Divisions of the Western Theatre Command took part in pre-planned annual exercises in the Gobi desert and Aksai Chin. Following this the divisions moved towards the Line of Actual Control (LAC) in eastern Ladakh. The divisions stayed in eastern Ladakh from May 2020 to February 2021 following which they rotated with the 8th and the 11th Motorised Divisions. A total of 90% of China's deployment in Ladakh is rotated. Amidst the standoff, military in Xinjiang has undergone modernisation.

6th Mechanised Infantry Division 

 People's Liberation Army Ground Force
 6th Highland Mechanised Infantry Division at Depsang Plains.
 Two mechanised infantry regiments/brigades
7th Mechanised Infantry Regiment
 18th Mechanised Infantry Regiment
 One armoured regiment
Combat support includes a field artillery regiment, air defence regiment, combat engineer battalion, electronic warfare battalion, CBRN defence battalion, divisional reconnaissance battalion
Each mechanised infantry regiment/brigade has four mechanised battalions
A tank battalion
Artillery battalion
Combat support is provided by an engineer battalion and a signal battalion
Anti-Aircraft Artillery Regiment
 A battalion of 24 GZ-09 PGZ-07 
 A battalion of 18 HQ-17 systems
 Six FN-6
 Aviation regiment
 Squadron of Harbin Z-9G and Mi-17I

4th Motorised Infantry Division 

 People's Liberation Army Ground Force
 4th Highland Motorised Infantry Division at Galwan Valley, Hot Springs and Pangong Tso.
 11th Motorised Infantry Regiment following standard table of organisation
 12th Motorised Infantry Regiment
 A tank regiment, artillery regiment 
Anti-tank, anti-aircraft artillery battalions
 Type 86 ICVs, WZ-551, 6 x 6 APCs, VN-1 8 x 8 APCs with Red Arrow 10
Army Groups providing the following support:
 Artillery brigade
Two battalions of PCL-181
 Two battalions of PHL-03
 A battalion of twin-barreled 35mm towed anti-aircraft guns
 Twelve FM-90

PLA Air Force 

 PLA Air Force
 6th Fighter Division, Yinchuan, Ningxia
 Regiment of J-11 Shenyang
 Regiment of Chengdu J-7
 Regiment of Chengdu J-7Es
 33rd and 37th Fighter Division, Chongqing and Urumqi
 Bomber and transport division, Lintong and Qionglai

See also 

 Chinese People's Volunteer Army order of battle

References

Further reading 

 Kevin McCauley (13 January 2017) Snapshot: China’s Western Theater Command. China Brief 17: 1. Jamestown Foundation.
Kashif Anwar (16 August 2021). Chinese Drones in East Ladakh and India’s Response. Centre for Air Power Studies, New Delhi.

Orders of battle